Mohammad Ali Jauhar was an Indian Muslim scholar, freedom struggle activist. He co-founded the Jamia Millia Islamia with Mahmud Hasan Deobandi and others. He became the President of All India National Congress in 1923. He was also the first Vice-Chancellor of Jamia Millia Islamia. 

Below is a list of institutions and places named after him.

Institutions
 Gandhi Muhammad Ali Memorial Intermediate College, a Senior Secondary School in Belthara Road, Ballia, Uttar Pradesh, India.
 Maulana Muhammad Ali Jauhar Girls High School in Kolkata.
 Maulana Mohammad Ali Jouhar Academy of International Studies in Jamia Millia Islamia.
 Maulana Mohammad Ali College, a state college in Tangail, Bangladesh.
 Mohammad Ali Jauhar University, India

Places
 Maulana Mohammad Ali Johar Park in Lyari, Pakistan..
 Gulistan-e-Johar, neighbourhood in Karachi East, Pakistan.
Molana Muhammad Ali Johar Town, Lahore Pakistan 
 Jauharabad, a city in Pakistan.
 Johar Town, a union council in Pakistan.

Roads
 Maulana Mohammad Ali Jauhar Marg, New Delhi
 M.M Ali Road in Kozhikode.
 MM Ali Road in Chittagong.
 Mohammed Ali Road in Mumbai

References

Jamia Millia Islamia
Indian independence activists